Somondoco is a town and municipality in the Colombian Department of Boyacá. This town and larger municipal area are located in the Valle de Tenza. The Valle de Tenza is the ancient route connecting the Altiplano Cundiboyacense and the Llanos. The area is dotted with many such little towns all located at approximately the same altitude (1500–1700 meters). Somondoco borders Almeida in the east, Guayatá in the west, Guateque and Sutatenza in the north and in the south the Cundinamarca municipality of Ubalá.

The nearest larger town is Guateque which is about 30 minutes away by car. In Somondoco are several small companies producing handicrafts and collectables.

Etymology 
Somondoco is derived from the Chibcha words So = stone, Mon = bath, Co = support. The village is named after cacique Somendoco or Sumindoco.

History 
Somondoco is a very old center of population extending back into prehistory. The Muisca settled here due to the abundance of emeralds mined in the Andes mountains.

When the Spanish conquistadores led by Gonzalo Jiménez de Quesada arrived, Somondoco was ruled by a cacique named Sumindoco. He was loyal to the zaque of Hunza. The date of foundation of Somondoco is November 6, 1537.

Economy 
Main economical activities of Somondoco are emerald mining and agriculture; maize, tomatoes, sugar cane, beans, bananas and coffee.

References

Further reading

External links 

Municipalities of Boyacá Department
1537 establishments in the Spanish Empire
Populated places established in 1537
1537 disestablishments in the Muisca Confederation
Muysccubun
Colombian emeralds